Avni bej Delvina was one of the delegates of the Albanian Declaration of Independence.

References

20th-century Albanian politicians
19th-century Albanian politicians
Year of birth missing
All-Albanian Congress delegates
People from Delvinë
People from Janina vilayet